The Sherith Israel Temple is located at 624 Ruth Lyons Lane (originally Lodge Street), in the backstage entertainment district in downtown Cincinnati, Ohio. This is the oldest existing synagogue building west of the Allegheny Mountains and the fourth oldest building in downtown Cincinnati. It is the seventh oldest synagogue building in the United States.

The synagogue was built in 1860 and was an active synagogue until 1882. After that the building served as a warehouse, plumbing supply house, and machine shop.

Chris Cain, the city's historic preservation officer said, "This is a building of importance".

Despite the history of the former Sherith Israel Temple downtown, the city officially decided it should not be declared "historic" in 1998. Officials debated more than a year whether the building, once an Orthodox Jewish synagogue, should be saved.

The former synagogue was saved from demolition, renovated, and today houses condominia.

History

The congregation was founded in 1855 as an Orthodox congregation that objected to the Reform tendencies of  the Rockdale Temple, then known as K.K. Bene Israel.
The congregation merged with Congregation Ahabeth Achim in 1906.

See also

Oldest synagogues in the United States

External links
 Future of temple at stake 
 Potential Backstage Buyer Eyes Lost Temple

References

Synagogues in Cincinnati
Jews and Judaism in Cincinnati
Synagogues completed in 1860
Former synagogues in the United States
Former religious buildings and structures in Ohio